Robin Groot (born 12 January 2001), is a Dutch speed skater specializing in the sprint events.

In 2019, Groot won 3 medals at the Junior World Championships and 7 medals the following season 

Groot holds the track record small combination at Kardinge, Groningen.

Personal records

Tournament overview

source:

References

2001 births
Living people
Dutch female speed skaters
People from Alkmaar
21st-century Dutch women